Troshigino is a rural locality (a village) in Andomskoye Rural Settlement, Vytegorsky District, Vologda Oblast, Russia. The population was 61 as of 2002.

Geography 
Troshigino is located 32 km north of Vytegra (the district's administrative centre) by road. Terovo is the nearest rural locality.

References 

Rural localities in Vytegorsky District